The New Caledonian parakeet (Cyanoramphus saisseti)  or New Caledonian red-crowned parakeet, is a species of parrot in the family Psittaculidae. It is endemic to New Caledonia. The species was once considered to be conspecific with the red-fronted parakeet of New Zealand but is now considered a full species and is known to be the basal species in the genus Cyanoramphus, which had its origins in New Caledonia.

Habitat 
Its natural habitats are subtropical or tropical moist lowland forest, subtropical or tropical moist montane forest, dry savanna, and subtropical or tropical moist shrubland.

Cyanoramphus and the New Caledonian endemic genus Eunymphicus share a common ancestor. Cyanoramphus parakeets flew out from New Caledonia to colonise the Society Islands, Norfolk Island, Lord Howe Island, New Zealand, and several subantarctic islands south of New Zealand.

References

 Boon, W, Daugherty C & Chambers, G (2001) The Norfolk Island Green Parakeet and New Caledonian Red-crowned Parakeet are distinct species. Emu 101 113-121

New Caledonian parakeet
Endemic birds of New Caledonia
New Caledonian parakeet
Taxonomy articles created by Polbot
Taxobox binomials not recognized by IUCN 

pl:Modrolotka czerwonoczelna